The 2008 K League was the 26th season of the K League. The regular season and playoffs' format was the same as the one used in the 2007 season. It began on March 8, and the final of the playoffs finished on 7 December.

On 2 August 2008, the first ever Jomo Cup kicked off. The K League All-Stars squared off against the J.League All-Stars at the Japan National Stadium. Lee Woon-jae was selected as the K League All-Star Team's captain and Cha Bum-kun managed the squad. The K League All-Stars won the game by a score of 3–1.

Teams

Regular season

League table
Top six teams qualified for the championship playoffs.

Results

Championship playoffs

Bracket

Final table

Top scorers
This list includes goals of the championship playoffs. The official top goalscorer was decided with records of only regular season, and Dudu won the award with 15 goals.

Awards

Main awards
The K League Players' Player of the Year was published by Korean edition of FourFourTwo in summer, and was not an official award of the K League, but 124 players participated in the selection process.

Best XI

Source:

Attendance
The records were calculated for the regular season.

See also
 2008 in South Korean football
 2008 K League Championship
 2008 Korean League Cup
 2008 Korean FA Cup

References

External links
Official website 

K League seasons
1
South Korea
South Korea